Thomas Mills Wood (born April 19, 1963) is an American actor. He is known for his portrayal of police characters, especially Deputy Marshal Noah Newman in the 1993 film The Fugitive and its spinoff, the 1998 film U.S. Marshals.

Early life
Wood was born on April 19, 1963, in Long Beach, California, the son of Donna Wood, a finance professional, and Thomas Mills Wood, Sr., a variety performer and accountant.

Career
Beginning in 1988, Wood appeared in numerous television shows and over ten films including Ulee's Gold, Apollo 13, Under Siege, and Avalon. He worked for a variety of film directors including Andrew Davis, Ron Howard, Barry Levinson, Nora Ephron, and Victor Nuñez.

On Broadway, Wood starred with Jason Robards and Christopher Plummer in Harold Pinter's four-character No Man's Land and performed in off-Broadway productions starring opposite such actors as Laura Dern, Oliver Platt, and Kyle MacLachlan.

References

Further reading
Caro, Mark (8 March 1998) "The Tall Guy" Chicago Tribune

External links

1963 births
Living people
20th-century American male actors
21st-century American male actors
American male film actors
American male television actors
Male actors from California